Lethariella is a genus of fruticose lichens in the family Parmeliaceae. The genus was originally proposed as a subgenus of Usnea by Polish lichenologist Józef Motyka in his 1936 monograph of that genus. Norwegian botanist Hildur Krog elevated the taxon to generic status in 1976.

Three species of Lethariella are used by  ethnic peoples of Yunnan Province (China) as a component of purported health-promoting tea: Lethariella cashmeriana, L. sernanderi, and L. sinensis.

Species
Lethariella canariensis 
Lethariella cashmeriana 
Lethariella cladonioides 
Lethariella flexuosa 
Lethariella intricata 
Lethariella mieheana 
Lethariella sernanderi 
Lethariella sinensis  – China
Lethariella smithii 
Lethariella togashii 
Lethariella zahlbruckneri

References

Lecanorales genera
Parmeliaceae
Lichen genera
Taxa described in 1936
Taxa named by Józef Motyka